Guadalupe Eduardo Robles Medina (born 9 June 1959) is a Mexican politician from the National Action Party. From 2009 to 2012 he served as Deputy of the LXI Legislature of the Mexican Congress representing Sinaloa.

References

1959 births
Living people
Politicians from Sinaloa
National Action Party (Mexico) politicians
21st-century Mexican politicians
Members of the Congress of Sinaloa
People from Mocorito
Deputies of the LXI Legislature of Mexico
Members of the Chamber of Deputies (Mexico) for Sinaloa